Lac du Bois may refer to:

 Lac du Bois (camp), a French language summer camp in Minnesota, USA.
 Lac du Bois Grasslands Protected Area, a provincial park in British Columbia, Canada.

Also related
 Lake of the Woods (Lac des Bois), a lake lying between Canada and the USA.